Arctocyon ('bear dog') is an extinct genus of ungulate mammals. Arctocyon was a "ground dwelling omnivore", that lived from 61.3-56.8 Ma. Synonyms of Arctocyon include Claenodon, and Neoclaenodon. Arctocyon was likely plantigrade, meaning that it walked with its feet flat on the ground, rather than on its toes.

Description 
The members belonging to this genus were of variable size: they could be of the size of a large dog (such as Arctocyon primaevus) but also of a small bear (such as A. mumak) Arctocyon had relatively short and strong legs, equipped with claw-like hooves. The skull was long and robust, bearing a pronounced sagittal crest. This served as an anchor for strong chewing muscles. The teeth possessed a strange mix of "herbivore" and "carnivore" characteristics. The molars were powerful and grinding, similar to those of a bear (hence the name Arctocyon, meaning "bear-dog"). The incisors would seem to have been suitable for plucking foliage, while the canines were very elongated, forming what were effectively tusks. The lower canines, in particular, were exceptionally developed and were much more robust and longer than the upper ones. There was not as much disparity as in Mentoclaenodon, which possessed elongated upper canines.

A study carried out on the fossils of the species A. primaevus indicated that the postcranial skeleton of Arctocyon was equally peculiar. Some features suggest the ability to climb, such as development of the adductor and abductor muscles, development of the flexor muscles of the fingers (which allowed the ability to grasp), highly mobile joints, convex ulna and foot plantigrade with five fingers. However, in contrast to the very mobile paw joints, Arctocyon also possessed a very rigid posterior thoracic region, characterized by a revolute zygapophysis, unknown in modern mammals. The morphology of the first caudal vertebra also indicates that the tail was long, powerful and muscular, with a rigid base: it probably played a fundamental role in locomotion. The morphology of the hind legs was similar to that of the front legs: the development of the adductors, flexors and rotators of the mobile joints of the pelvis was highly developed.

The gigantic species A. mumak had different specializations: some characteristics of the tarsus, such as the great plantar tubercle on the navicular and a well-developed furrow below the sustentaculum tali, indicate that this species must have been of terrestrial and possibly fossorial habits.

Classification 
The genus Arctocyon was first described by de Blainville in 1841, on the basis of well-preserved fossil remains from the upper Paleocene sediments of France. The type species is Arctocyon primaevus, known for numerous fossil remains from various French deposits. Other species attributed to this genus are known in North America: A. ferox, described by Edward Drinker Cope in 1883 and known from fossils discovered in New Mexico, Wyoming, Alberta and Montana, similar in size to the European species. A. mumak, the largest species, was described by Van Valen in 1978 and subsequently found in Wyoming, Texas, Colorado and Saskatchewan. This species, initially known for an isolated jaw, was later well-studied thanks to an incomplete skeleton found in 1963 in the Bighorn Basin in Wyoming. Other North American species are A. corrugatus and A. acrogenius; the some specimens of which being ascribed to the species A. mumak. Other remains attributed to Arctocyon have been found in Germany.

Arctocyon is the eponymous genus of the family Arctocyonidae, a group of archaic mammals with uncertain affinities, once classified in the heterogeneous order of the Condylarthra and currently classified within either the basal Artiodactyla or Ferae. Arctocyon includes some of the largest arctocyonids ever to have lived, and was certainly a specialized member of the group. Similar to Arctocyon was Arctocyonides, also found in the French Palaeocene deposits but of smaller dimensions and leaner build. Another interesting arctocyonid is Mentoclaenodon, which possessed even more elongated canines.

Paleoecology 
This animal probably had an omnivorous diet: the molariform teeth indicate that Arctocyon's teeth could grind plant material, but the incisors, and in particular, the large canines, indicate the ability to feed on meat. The postcranial skeleton also suggests a mixed diet, even if the morphology is not found in any modern mammal. Some species of Arctocyon (e.g. A. primaevus) undoubtedly had the ability to climb trees, while others (A. mumak) were certainly terrestrial and may have been burrowers or even fossorial.

One study indicated that A. primaevus, morphologically, was more similar to some extinct South American marsupial mammals, such as the Sparassodonta, than to any other mammal. The general size and proportions are a mix between Borhyaena and Prothylacinus, while some characteristics (the development of ridges and processes on the humerus) made it similar to Prothylacinus. In general, it appears that Arctocyon and its close relatives, with their tusk-like canines and molariform teeth indicating an omnivorous diet, and a skeleton more like that of carnivores than that of ungulates, represented a very unusual mosaic of features, and thus their paleobiology and paleoecology are therefore very difficult to establish.

References

Condylarths
Paleocene genus extinctions
Paleocene mammals of North America
Fossil taxa described in 1841
Taxa named by Henri Marie Ducrotay de Blainville
Prehistoric placental genera